Sparkman & Stephens is a naval architecture and yacht brokerage firm with offices in Newport, Rhode Island and Ft. Lauderdale, Florida, USA. The firm performs design and engineering of new and existing vessels for pleasure, commercial, and military use. Sparkman & Stephens also acts as a yacht and ship brokerage. The firm offers similar design and engineering services for the performance optimization of existing yachts.

Their designs have won most of the major international yacht races such as the America's Cup, for several decades, including a string of victories in the Fastnet and Sydney to Hobart as well as winning twice the Whitbread Round the World Race by Sayula II in 1974 and Flyer in 1978.  S&S has a number of custom yacht design projects as well as being designers for boat builders such as Nautor's Swan, Grand Banks Yachts, and Morris Yachts. With more than 100 units built, the S&S design #1710 also known as Swan 36 became the most utilized design in the history of Sparkman & Stephens.

During World War II the company was employed to design the hulls for the invaluable DUKW 'army duck' and the Ford GPA amphibious jeep. For this Roderick Stephens was awarded the Medal of Freedom, the United States' highest civilian award.

History

Sparkman & Stephens Inc was formally created on October 28, 1929, with five partners: Drake Sparkman and his younger brother James Sparkman, James Murray, and brothers Olin J. Stephens and Roderick Stephens.

The Stephens brothers began their careers as self-taught sailors on Barnstable Bay, Massachusetts. Both entered the marine industry at an early age – Olin apprenticing in yacht design under Philip Rhodes, and Roderick learning shipbuilding at the prominent Nevins Yard in City Island, New York, which would later produce several of his firm's designs. With their father's backing, the 21-year-old Olin and his brother entered into a partnership with the already successful yacht broker Drake Sparkman, and Sparkman & Stephens, Inc. was formed.

S&S remains involved in designs having created a range of production sailing yachts such as the Morris 36 and 52 and a number of custom super-sailers including Victoria of Strathern and the 52-meter ketch Nazenin V, recently bestowed with multiple Superyacht of the Year Awards.

In August 2018 Donald Tofias purchased S&S and is now the firm's President.

The brokers at Sparkman & Stephens represent over 800 crewed charter yachts worldwide in both sail and power, from 55 to 200 + ft.

Designs

Aura A35
Cape Cod Mercury 15
Catalina 38
D&M 22
Designers Choice
Dolphin 24
DUKW
Howmar 12
Hughes 26
Hughes 31
Hughes 35
Hughes 38-1
Hughes 38-2
Hughes 38-3
Hughes 40
Hughes 48
Interclub Dinghy
Lightning (dinghy)
Nautor Swan 47
New Horizons 26
North Star 38
North Star 48
North Star 80/20
North Star 500
North Star 600
North Star 1000
North Star 1500
Pilot 35
Sailmaster 22
Seafarer 23 Kestrel
Seafarer 45
Seafarer 46
Seafarer 48
S&S 34
Shields (keelboat)
Stevens 47
Tartan 27
Tartan 34 C
Tartan 34-2
Tartan Ten
Tartan 41
Weekender 24
Yankee 38

See also
List of sailboat designers and manufacturers
William Shaw (yacht designer)
Jessica Watson

References

External links 

Official website
S&S Association

Sparkman & Stephens